Sellia Marina is a town and comune in the province of Catanzaro, in the Calabria region of southern Italy.

Geography
Sellia Marina houses the master station of the LORAN-C transmitters in the Mediterranean, for low frequency radio navigation.

Notes and references

Cities and towns in Calabria